Novo Horizonte Futebol Clube, commonly known as Novo Horizonte, is a Brazilian football club based in Ipameri, Goiás state. They competed in the Série C and in the Copa do Brasil once.

History
The club was founded on February 27, 1968. Novo Horizonte won the Campeonato Goiano Second Level in 2007. The club competed in the Série C in 2002, when they were eliminated in the Second Stage of the competition by Anápolis. Novo Horizonte competed in the Copa do Brasil in 2004, when they were eliminated in the First Round by Santo André from São Paulo state.

Achievements

 Campeonato Goiano Second Level:
 Winners (1): 2007

Stadium
Novo Horizonte Futebol Clube play their home games at Estádio Durval Ferreira Franco. The stadium has a maximum capacity of 1,904 people.

References

Association football clubs established in 1968
Football clubs in Goiás
1968 establishments in Brazil